Ebina may refer to:

Ebina, Kanagawa, a city in Japan
Ebina Station in Ebina, Kanagawa
Ebina (surname), a Japanese surname